Emmet Township is one of twelve townships in Emmet County, Iowa, USA.  As of the 2000 census, its population was 178.

History
Emmet Township is named from the county. It was created prior to 1876, but the exact date is unknown because records were lost in a courthouse fire.

Geography
According to the United States Census Bureau, Emmet Township covers an area of 28.42 square miles (73.6 square kilometers); of this, 28.1 square miles (72.78 square kilometers, 98.89 percent) is land and 0.32 square miles (0.82 square kilometers, 1.11 percent) is water.

Adjacent townships
 Ellsworth Township (east)
 Center Township (southeast)
 Estherville Township (south)
 Richland Township, Dickinson County (southwest)
 Superior Township, Dickinson County (west)

Major highways
  Iowa Highway 4

Lakes
 Eagle Lake

School districts
 Estherville Lincoln Central Community School District

Political districts
 Iowa's 4th congressional district
 State House District 7
 State Senate District 4

References
 United States Census Bureau 2008 TIGER/Line Shapefiles
 United States Board on Geographic Names (GNIS)
 United States National Atlas

External links
 US-Counties.com
 City-Data.com

Townships in Emmet County, Iowa
Townships in Iowa